Calderonia is a genus of grasshoppers in the subfamily Catantopinae with no tribe assigned.  Species can be found in Madagascar.

Species
The Orthoptera Species File lists a monotypic species Calderonia biplagiata Bolívar, 1908.

References

External Links 
 

Acrididae genera
Catantopinae 
Orthoptera of Africa
Monotypic Orthoptera genera